Equinox commonly refers to:

 Equinox, the instant of time when the plane of Earth's equator passes through the center of the Sun
 March equinox
 September equinox
 Equinox (celestial coordinates), either of two places on the celestial sphere at which the ecliptic intersects the celestial equator

Equinox may also refer to:

Arts and entertainment

Fictional characters
 Equinox (comics), a Marvel Comics supervillain
 Equinox (DC Comics), a DC comics character, son of Power Girl
 Equinox, a character in Batman: The Brave and the Bold

Film and television
 Equinox (1970 film), an American horror film
 Equinox (1986 film), a Canadian drama film
 Equinox (1992 film), an American film
 Equinox (TV programme), a British science and documentary programme 1986–2006
 Equinox (2020 TV series), a Danish TV series
 "Equinox" (Star Trek: Voyager), an episode of the TV series

Gaming
 Equinox (1986 video game)
 Equinox (1993 video game)

Literature 
 Equinox (novel), a 1973 novel by Samuel R. Delany
 The Equinox, a occultism periodical 1909–1998
 EQuinox, the official magazine of EverQuest II

Music

Bands 
 Equinox (thrash metal band), from Norway, started in 1987
 Equinox (electro-industrial band), a 1998 project of Front Line Assembly
 Equinox (Bulgarian band), Eurovision Song Contest 2018 contestants

Opera
 Equinox (opera), a Slovene-language opera by Marjan Kozina

Albums 
 Equinox (Sérgio Mendes album), 1967
 Equinox (Red Garland album), 1979
 Equinox (Omar Rodríguez-López album), 2013
 Equinox (Styx album), 1975
 Equinox (EP), by Northlane and In Hearts Wake, 2016
 Équinoxe, by Jean Michel Jarre, 1978
 Equinoxe Infinity, by Jean Michel Jarre, 2018
 The Equinox (album), by Organized Konfusion, 1997

Songs
 Equinox (jazz standard), by John Coltrane, 1964
 "Equinox", by Heaven Shall Burn, from the 2008 album Iconoclast (Part 1: The Final Resistance)
 "First of the Year (Equinox)" by Skrillex, 2011

Businesses and organizations
 Equinox Group, an American luxury fitness company
 Equinox Minerals, a mining company headquartered in Canada and Australia
 Equinox (MLM), a defunct multi-level marketing company
 Equinox Systems, manufacturer of serial communications devices, acquired by Avocent
 Equinox Payments, formerly Hypercom, an electronic payment processing company
 Equinox (organization), European anti-racist organization
 Equinox Publishing (Sheffield), an independent academic publishing based in Sheffield, UK
 Equinox Publishing (Jakarta), Jakarta-based publisher of books

Computing
 Equinox (Amiga demogroup), 1987–1996
 Equinox (Atari demogroup), 1988–2007
 Equinox (OSGi), an Eclipse project to implement OSGi R4.x

Places
 Equinox Mountain, Vermont, U.S.

Sports
 Vin Gerard (born 1986), ring name Equinox 
 Jimmy Olsen (wrestler) (born 1986), ring name Equinox
 Equinox Marathon, an annual running marathon in Fairbanks, Alaska, U.S.

Transportation
 Celebrity Equinox, cruise ship launched in 2009
 Chevrolet Equinox, a General Motors SUV

See also
 Spring equinox (disambiguation)
 Autumnal equinox (disambiguation)
 Equinox Day (disambiguation)
 Solstice (disambiguation)